The sport of football in French Polynesia is run by the Fédération Tahitienne de Football.
 The association administers the national football team. With 146 association football clubs and over 11,200 registered players, football is the most popular sport among the inhabitants on the island of Tahiti.

League system

French Polynesia football venues

References